Bob Curtis (born September 23, 1932 – November 16, 2004) was an American Catholic priest notable for working as an actor. Playing priests, he appeared in the comedy Fatso (1980) and the soap opera Falcon Crest (1982–1990).

References

External links
 
 

1932 births
2004 deaths
American male television actors
20th-century American male actors
20th-century American Roman Catholic priests